Breaking the Waves is a 1996 psychological drama film directed and co-written by Lars von Trier and starring English stage actress Emily Watson as her feature film acting debut, along with Stellan Skarsgård, a frequent collaborator with von Trier. Set in the Scottish Highlands in the early 1970s, it is about an unusual young woman and of the love she has for her husband, who asks her to have sex with other men when he becomes immobilised from a work accident.

The film is an international co-production between Denmark and seven other European countries, while the former's involvement as his first film led by von Trier under his Danish company Zentropa. As von Trier's first film made after his founding of the Dogme 95 movement in 1995, it is heavily influenced by the movement's style and ethos. It is also the first film in Trier's Golden Heart Trilogy, which also includes The Idiots (1998) and Dancer in the Dark (2000), the former as a certified Dogme film.

Breaking the Waves was well-received, with Emily Watson's acting receiving critical praise. The movie  has been described as "perhaps von Trier's most widely acclaimed film". The film won numerous awards including the Grand Prix at the 1996 Cannes Film Festival.

Plot
Bess McNeill is a young  and pretty Scottish woman, who has, in the past, had treatment for unspecified mental health illness after the death of her brother. She marries oil rig worker Jan Nyman, a Danish non-churchgoer, despite disapproval from her community and her Free Scottish Presbyterian Calvinist church. Bess is steadfast and pure of heart, but quite simple and childlike in her beliefs. During her frequent visits to the church, she prays to God and carries on conversations with Him in her own voice, believing that He is responding directly through her.

Bess is infatuated with Jan and has difficulty living without him when he is away on the oil platform. Jan makes occasional phone calls to Bess in which they express their love and sexual desires. Bess grows needy and prays for his immediate return. The next day, Jan is severely injured in an industrial accident and is flown back to the mainland. Bess believes her prayer was the reason the accident occurred, that God was punishing her for her selfishness in asking for him to neglect his job and come back to her. No longer able to perform sexually and mentally affected by the paralysis, Jan asks Bess to find a lover. Bess is devastated and storms out. Jan then attempts to commit suicide and fails. He falls unconscious and is readmitted to hospital.

Jan's condition deteriorates. He urges Bess to find another lover and tell him the details, as it will be as if they are together and will revitalise his spirits. Though her sister-in-law Dodo constantly reassures her that nothing she does will affect his recovery, Bess begins to believe these suggestions are the will of God and in accordance with loving Jan wholly. Despite her repulsion and inner turmoil at the thought of being with other men, she perseveres in her own sexual debasement as she believes it will save her husband. Bess throws herself at Jan's doctor, but when he rebuffs her, she takes to picking up men off the street and allowing herself to be brutalised in increasingly cruel sexual encounters. The entire village is scandalised by these doings, and Bess is excommunicated. In the face of being cast out from her church, she proclaims, "You cannot love words. You cannot be in love with a word. You can only love a human being".

Dodo and Jan's doctor agree the only way to keep Bess safe from herself is to have her committed, and as far away from her husband as possible, whom they believe to be in terminal decline. It is then that Bess decides to make what she thinks is the ultimate sacrifice for Jan: she unflinchingly goes out to a derelict ship full of barbarous sailors, who violently gang rape and attack her, causing her death. Her church deems her soul to be lost and hell-bound. Unbeknownst to the church elders, Jan and his friends have substituted bags of sand for Bess's body inside her sealed coffin. Jan is later shown, substantially restored to health despite the doctors not having thought it possible, burying Bess in the ocean, deep in grief. The film ends in magical realism as Bess's body is nowhere to be seen on the sonar, and church bells ring from on high in the sky.

Cast

Production

Development
Breaking the Waves was von Trier's first film after founding the Dogme 95 movement with fellow Danish director Thomas Vinterberg. Nonetheless, the film breaks many of the movement's "rules", including built sets, post-dubbed music and computer graphics. It was shot entirely with handheld Super35mm cameras and is the first of von Trier's "Golden Heart trilogy", so named after a children's book he read about a little girl lost in the woods who gives away everything she has to others needier than herself called Guldhjerte. He wanted to make a naturalistic film that was also a religious film without any miracles. Von Trier claimed that it took him five years to write the film and get financial backing, and he began to lose enthusiasm for it right after filming began. It had a budget of 42 million kroner.

Helena Bonham Carter was von Trier's first choice to play the role of Bess, but she dropped out just before shooting was to start, reportedly due to the large amount of nudity and sexuality required by the role. Several other big-name actresses were considered, but none of them were comfortable with the subject matter. Von Trier was eventually won over by Emily Watson's audition, even though she was a complete unknown in the film industry at the time.

Filming
Von Trier initially wanted to film it on the west coast of Jutland, then in Norway, then in Ostende, Belgium, then Ireland before finally settling with Scotland. The exterior scenes were shot in Scotland: the graveyard was built for the film on Isle of Skye; the church is in Lochailort, the harbour in Mallaig, and the beach in Morar. Von Trier chose the Isle of Skye because it was popular with 19th century English romantic painters and writers. The interiors were shot at Det Danske Filmstudie in Lyngby, Denmark.

Music
End of film credits:
 "All the Way from Memphis" – Mott the Hoople
 "Blowin' in the Wind" – Tom Harboe, Jan Harboe & Ulrik Corlin
 "Pipe Major Donald MacLean" – Peter Roderick MacLeod
 "In a Broken Dream" – Python Lee Jackson, featuring Rod Stewart
 "Cross-Eyed Mary" – Jethro Tull
 "I Did What I Did for Maria" – Tony Christie
 "Virginia Plain" – Roxy Music
 "Whiter Shade of Pale" – Procol Harum
 "Hot Love" – T. Rex
 "Suzanne" – Leonard Cohen
 "Love Lies Bleeding" – Elton John
 "Goodbye Yellow Brick Road" – Elton John
 "Whiskey in the Jar" – Thin Lizzy
 "Child in Time" – Deep Purple
 "Life on Mars" – David Bowie
 "Siciliana" (Sonata BWV 1031 / 2nd movement) – Johann Sebastian Bach
 "Gay Gordons" – Tom Harboe, Jan Harboe & Ulrik Corlin
 "Scotland the Brave" – Tom Harboe, Jan Harboe & Ulrik Corlin
 "Barren Rock of Aden" – Tom Harboe, Jan Harboe & Ulrik Corlin
 "Happy Landing" – P. Harmann

The original soundtrack album also includes "He's Gonna Step on You Again" – John Kongos.

Style
The film is divided into seven different chapters. Each chapter begins with a different impressionistically filmed panorama title frame featuring early 1970s rock music interludes. Each of these chapters is filmed with a motionless camera, but features movement in the panorama. In the original released film, the epilogue, "The Funeral", features David Bowie's "Life on Mars", which was replaced by Elton John's "Your Song" on early home video releases; the more recent Criterion edition restores the Bowie song. The overall style is heavily influenced by the realist Dogme 95 movement, of which von Trier was a founding member, and its grainy images and hand-held photography give it the superficial aesthetic of a Dogme film. However, the Dogme rules demand the use of real locations, whereas many of the locations in Breaking the Waves were constructed in a studio. In addition, the film is set in the past and contains dubbed music, as well as a brief scene featuring CGI, none of which is permitted by the Dogme rules.

Some saw Breaking the Waves as mainstream cinema. Others saw it as a high budget experimental film due to its elaborate chapter shots and handheld camera in a sketchy raw style that followed the actors closely. Breaking the Waves marked an important change in focus for Lars von Trier. In von Trier's early films, the protagonist is a man, typically a disillusioned idealist whose downfall is furthered by a deceitful, fatal woman. In this film, for the first time the protagonist is a woman, emotional and naive. This motif continues in his later films, except for the comedy The Boss of It All. Breaking the Waves controversially connects religion with phallocentrism. The film focuses on sexual perversity and female martyrdom, issues that continue in Trier's later work. Some critics see the self-sacrificing submissive heroine as a misogynist cliche.

The film was made using Panavision equipment. The low-res look of the scenes was obtained by transferring the film to video, and then back to film again. According to von Trier, "what we did was take a style and lay it like a filter over the story. It's like decoding a television signal when you pay to see a film. Here we encoded the film, and the audience has to decode it. The raw, documentary style that I imposed on the film, which actually dissolves and contradicts it, means that we can accept the story as it is".

Reception

Critical response

The film garnered an 85% approval rating, and an average rating of 8.24/10 on Rotten Tomatoes from 59 reviews. The critical consensus reads, "Breaking the Waves offers a remarkable testament to writer-director Lars von Trier's insight and filmmaking skill -- and announces Emily Watson as a startling talent". It also holds a 79/100 rating on Metacritic based on 28 reviews, citing a "generally favorable" reception. During a show where film personalities listed their top movies of the 1990s, Breaking the Waves was named one of the ten best films of the decade by both critic Roger Ebert and director Martin Scorsese.

In an essay for the Criterion Collection, David Sterritt interpreted it as a film in which "no one is 'bad', everyone is 'good', and when trouble flares anyway, it's because incompatible concepts of 'good' can violently conflict with one another"; he praised the ending as "a magical vision that elevates the final moments to radically metaphysical heights".

Box office
The film grossed over $23 million worldwide including $4.6 million in France; $4 million in the US and Canada;  $1.7 million in Italy; and $1.1 million in the UK.

Accolades

Operatic adaptation
Composer Missy Mazzoli and librettist Royce Vavrek premiered their operatic adaptation of the film on 22 September 2016, at Opera Philadelphia. The work was called "the most startling and moving new American opera in memory" by parterre box, with Opera News proclaiming that it "stands among the best twenty-first-century American operas yet produced".

Home media
The Criterion Collection initially released the film in the United States in 1997 on LaserDisc in a director's approved 2-disc edition and featured four deleted scenes selected by Lars von Trier, the complete European director's cut, a promo clip prepared by Lars von Trier for the 1996 Cannes Film Festival and the U.S. theatrical trailer. On 27 January 1998, the film was made available on VHS format courtesy of Artisan Entertainment in an edited cut, while a subsequent DVD release was made available from Artisan on 25 July 2000, in a non-anamorphic edition and lacking the special features which appeared on Criterion's LaserDisc edition. Criterion again reacquired home distribution rights to the film and released a Dual-Format digipack 1-disc Blu-ray and 2-disc DVD edition on 15 April 2014. The set contains a new 4k transfer and DTS-HD 5.1 Master Audio, most of the previous restored special features from the original LaserDisc, in addition to new select-scene audio commentary featuring von Trier, editor Anders Refn, and location scout Anthony Dod Mantle, new interview with filmmaker and critic Stig Björkman, new interviews with actors Emily Watson and Stellan Skarsgård, interview from 2004 with actor Adrian Rawlins, excerpts from Watson's audition tape, with commentary by von Trier, deleted scene featuring late actor Katrin Cartlidge and a booklet featuring an essay by critic David Sterritt and an excerpt from the 1999 book "Trier on von Trier".

In the United Kingdom, Breaking the Waves was first released on VHS home video on 28 April 1997, while a second VHS was released in a 'Special Widescreen Edition' on 1 October 1999 via Pathé. Pathé made the film available on DVD format on 1 September 2003, and featured its original aspect ratio in a 16:9 anamorphic screen, with Dolby Digital English 5.1, Italian 2.0 dub and multiple subtitle options. The special features include select commentary from Lars von Trier and Anders Refn interviewed by Anthony Dod Mantle. Curzon Artificial Eye currently occupy distribution rights in the UK and have released the film on DVD and on Blu-ray on 10 November 2014.

References

Bibliography
 
 Ebbe Villadsen: Danish Erotic Film Classics (2005)
 Georg Tiefenbach: Drama und Regie (Writing and Directing): Lars von Trier's Breaking the Waves, Dancer in the Dark, Dogville. Würzburg: Königshausen & Neumann 2010. .

External links
 
 
 
 
 
 
 
 Breaking the Waves: Breaking the Rules an essay by David Sterritt at the Criterion Collection

1996 drama films
1996 films
Adultery in films
Best Danish Film Bodil Award winners
Best Danish Film Robert Award winners
Best Foreign Film César Award winners
Best Foreign Film Guldbagge Award winners
Danish drama films
Scottish films
Scottish drama films
English-language Danish films
English-language Scottish films
European Film Awards winners (films)
Films about Christianity
Films about paraplegics or quadriplegics
Films about psychiatry
Films about sexuality
Films about suicide
Films adapted into operas
Films directed by Lars von Trier
Films set in Scotland
Films set in the 1970s
Films shot in Denmark
Films shot in Highland (council area)
Heart of Sarajevo Award for Best Film winners
Medical-themed films
National Society of Film Critics Award for Best Film winners
Cannes Grand Prix winners
1996 independent films
Films produced by Peter Aalbæk Jensen
1990s English-language films
1990s British films
1990s psychological drama films
British psychological drama films
Films about disability